Gatham is a 2020 Indian Telugu-language thriller film directed by Kiran Kondamadugula and starring  Bhargava Poludasu, Rakesh Galebhe, and Poojitha Kuraparthi. It premiered on Amazon Prime Video on 6 November 2020. The film was selected in the Indian Panorama of feature films 2020 and was screened at International Film Festival of India in January 2021.

Entire film was shot in California, USA during extreme winter conditions that lasted 28 days from December to January 2019.

Originally, the makers planned for a theatrical release, but due to the COVID-19 pandemic, it was decided to release the film through the OTT service Amazon Prime Video. The film was released worldwide on 6 November 2020 to generally positive reviews.

Plot 
Rishi (Rakesh Galebhe) wakes up from a coma and remembers nothing from his past sets out on a journey along with his girlfriend Adithi (Poojitha Kuraparthi) to visit Rishi's father and their car breaks down in a route. A stranger (Bhargava Poludasu) offers them a stay at his house and as their stay extends, Rishi gets nightmares and the stranger behaves freakishly. With each passing moment, there are startling twists, and many dots between Rishi's past and the stranger get connected which leaves the couple shell-shocked. What is Rishi's connection with the stranger and how does he and his girlfriend come out of the weird situation is the story of Gatham.

Cast 
 Bhargava Poludasu as Arjun
 Rakesh Galebhe as Rishi
 Poojitha Kuraparthi as Meera
 Thirumudi Thulasiraman as Ramesh 
 Harsha Vardhan Pratap as Harsha
 Uss Uppuluri as Dr.Srikanth
 Sof Puchley as Sarah Peters 
 Raghu Gopal as Laxman 
 Prasad Rani as Dr. Viswa
 Rohit Devullapally as Care Taker
 Lakshmi Bharadwaj

Production 
The film was produced in the United States. It is based on Kiran Kondamadugula's own short film and was shot in Lake Tahoe. Sricharan Pakala scored the music for the film.

Release 
Due to COVID-19 pandemic, the film was only released on Amazon Prime Video on 6 November.

Reception 
Rajeev Masand praised the movie quoting "How a scrappy little indie movie found its way to an organic success!"

Vishal Menon of Film Companion wrote, "Gatham is one of those films that’s impossible to talk about without revealing spoilers but it’s a credit to its makers that viewers feel like running around explaining the crafty deception of the film they’ve just watched."

Sangeetha Devi Dundoo, writing for The Hindu, said that "Gatham is a deceptively engaging thriller."

Neeshita Nyayapati, writing for Times of India, summarized Gatham as "Uncomfortable and gritty, Gatham will keep you engaged from the get-go."

Bhuvanesh Chandar of The New Indian Express wrote, "Outstanding suspense cinema that checks all boxes."

Sushri Sahu of Mashable wrote, "A Lackluster NRI Film That Reveals Itself To Be A Taut Psychological Thriller"

References

External links 

2020 films
2020 thriller films
Indian thriller films
2020s Telugu-language films
Films set in the United States
Films shot in the United States
Films scored by Sricharan Pakala
Amazon Prime Video original films